The 2012–13 Florida Atlantic Owls men's basketball team represented Florida Atlantic University during the 2012–13 NCAA Division I men's basketball season. The Owls, led by fifth year head coach Mike Jarvis, played their home games at the FAU Arena, and were members of the East Division of the Sun Belt Conference. They finished the season 14–18, 9–11 in Sun Belt play to finish in fifth place in the East Division. They lost in the first round of the Sun Belt tournament to Troy.

This was the Owls final season as a member of the Sun Belt. In July, 2013, they will join Conference USA.

Roster

Schedule

|-
!colspan=9| Regular season

|-
!colspan=9| Regular season

|-
!colspan=9| 2013 Sun Belt tournament

References

Florida Atlantic Owls men's basketball seasons
Florida Atlantic
Florida Atlantic Owls men's b
Florida Atlantic Owls men's b